There are a number of townships named Dawson in Ontario:

Dawson Township, Manitoulin District, Ontario
Dawson, Ontario (incorporated)

Township name disambiguation pages